Killer Pad is a 2008 comedy horror film directed by Robert Englund and starring Daniel Franzese, Eric Jungmann and Shane McRae.

Plot
Three friends, Brody, Craig, and Doug, get a new house from Winnie, an Asian woman, so they can hook up with women. They encounter a mysterious Mexican man who warns them of the devil, but they think he is a squatter who is talking about hot sauce so they ignore him. At the house they meet three attractive women, Lucy, Jezebel, and Delilah. They once again encounter the Mexican and he attempts to warn them that the house is evil, but he becomes possessed by the house and rips out his own heart and jumps out the window, which seemingly kills him. A fire marshall enters to check but he is dragged to hell. Believing they passed the inspection, the guys decide to throw a party.

During the party several party goers, including actor Joey Lawrence, a pair of german triplets, Vance and Wayne, and a midget porn star named Tito are killed. Eric and Craig realize this after they discover the corpses and tell Brody this. The Mexican appears, now in drag and revealed to be an angel, and tells the guys that the house is actually a portal to hell. The guys realize that Delilah and Jezebel are behind the killings after they witness them killing a geek. Brody attempts to warn Lucy about her friends but he discovers that she is actually the devil and that Delilah and Jezebel are her minions. Lucy attempts to seduce Brody but he is disgusted when he finds out she has a penis.

The guys attempt to warn the remaining party guests about the murders, but Lucy, Jezebel, and Delilah arrive and trap the guests. The guys attempt to defeat them using holy songs but this does not work. Backwater, a priest, sends Delilah and Jezebel to hell using a rock song. Lucy is weakened but Brody is hesitant to finish her off but is reminded she has a penis and sends her back to hell. The house is destroyed, reviving all of the slain party guests. Winnie arrives and offers to help the guys find a new house. However Winnie is revealed to be a demon and tells the guys to "buckle up" ending the film.

Cast

External links
 

American comedy horror films
2008 films
Films directed by Robert Englund
2008 comedy horror films
Films about spirit possession
Cross-dressing in American films
Films about angels
The Devil in film
2000s English-language films
2000s American films